Unforgiving Mistress, released in 1999, is the second album by Canadian country singer Corb Lund.

Track listing

 "Mora (Blackberry)" - 3:40
 "The Case of the Wine Soaked Preacher" - 3:21
 "Remains of You" - 2:47
 "Guitar from the Wall" - 3:11
 "Where is my Soldier?" - 3:23
 "Spanish Armada" - 3:26
 "I've Been Needin'" - 4:18
 "Young and Jaded" - 2:07
 "Engine Revver" - 3:21
 "We Used to Ride 'em" - 2:58
 "The Oldest Rhythm" - 4:25

References

1999 albums
Corb Lund and the Hurtin' Albertans albums
Outside Music albums